David Bianco (1954 – June 20, 2018) was an American Grammy Award-winning record producer, who worked with such artists as Tom Petty, Bob Dylan, Lucinda Williams, Fleetwood Mac, Ozzy Osbourne, Danzig, AC/DC, Cathedral, Primal Scream, Teenage Fanclub, Buffalo Tom, Claytown Troupe,The Posies, The Caulfields, Black Lab, The Damned, Buckcherry, Dropkick Murphys, Big Head Todd and the Monsters, Masters of Reality, Mick Jagger, Failure, Rollins Band and John Mellencamp.

He won a Grammy Award for the Best Engineered Album, Non-Classical, being Wildflowers by Tom Petty.

Bianco died in June 2018, from a stroke.

References

1954 births
2018 deaths
American record producers
Grammy Award winners